ISO 7200, titled Technical product documentation - Data fields in title blocks and document headers, is an international technical standard defined by ISO which describes title block formats to be used in technical drawings.

Revisions 
 ISO 7200:1984
 ISO 7200:2004

Other ISO standard related to technical drawing 
 ISO 128 for the general principles of presentation in technical drawings
 ISO 216 for paper sizes

See also 
 Engineering drawing : Title block
 List of International Organization for Standardization standards

References 

07200
Technical drawing